Powell is a male given name.

It may refer to:

 Powell S. Barnett (1883–1971) U.S. musician and civil rights activist
 Powell F. Carter Jr. (1931–2017) U.S. Navy admiral
 Powell Clayton (1833–1914) U.S. soldier, politician, businessman
 Powel Crosley Jr. (1886–1961) U.S. entrepreneur
 Powell Lindsay (1905–1987) U.S. actor
 Powell Lloyd  (1900–1987) UK opera singer
 Powell A. Moore (1938–2018) U.S. federal public servant
 Powell St. John (1940–2021) U.S. singer-songwriter
 Powell Smythe (19th century) U.S. politician
 Powell Weaver (1890–1951) U.S. musician

See also

 
 
 Powell (surname)
 Powell (disambiguation)